Lakhujiraje Jadhav Rao was a grandee of Sindkhed Raja in the present-day Buldhana district of Maharashtra state during the 16th century. He was maternal Grandfather of Maratha Emperor  Chatrapati Shivaji Maharaj.

Background
Lakhuji Jadhav was a Maratha  chief.

He was one of the early exponents of guerilla warfare and he became one of the most important sardars in the Nizam Shahi sultanate. He is known to be the victor of the famous fort of Devagiri.  After he won the war of Khandesh and the controlled Khandesh and became the Maharao of Khandesh with the help of Shinde's Rao of West Khandesh from Dhanur and Songir.

His daughter was Jijabai, the mother of Shivaji, founder of the Maratha Empire. She was born on 12 January 1598 and married at an early age to Shahaji Bhosale, a nobleman and military commander under the Adil Shahi sultans of Bijapur in present-day Karnataka.

Death
Lakhuji Jadhav was murdered by treachery at Daulatabad, along with his sons and a grandson, at the orders of the Nizam Shah in 1629. At the time, his daughter Jijabai was pregnant with Shivaji.

Descendants
One of the surviving descendants of Lakhuji Jadhav was Shambusing Jadhav who famously fought in the Battle of Pavankhind. His great-grandson was the famous Maratha commander Dhanaji Jadhav.

References

People of the Maratha Empire
People from Maharashtra
People from Buldhana district
16th-century Indian people